Dead zone may refer to:

Science and technology
 Dead zone (cell phone), an area where cell phones cannot transmit to a nearby cell site
 Dead zone (ecology), low-oxygen areas in the world's oceans
 Dead band, the region of insensitivity of a system

Arts and entertainment

Games
 Dead Zone (video game), a video game produced by SunSoft
 Dead zone (video gaming), term for a region of the screen in video gaming
 Deadzone (Skirmish Game), by Mantic Games

Literature
 The Dead Zone (novel), a novel by Stephen King

Film
 The Dead Zone (film), a film based on the Stephen King novel starring Christopher Walken
 Dragon Ball Z: Dead Zone, the first of thirteen Dragon Ball Z films
 Whisper of Dead Zone, the translated English title of the 2012 Turkish film Ölü Bölgeden Fısıltılar.

Television
 The Dead Zone (TV series), a television series based on the Stephen King novel, starring Anthony Michael Hall

Sports
 Dead zone (gridiron football), a technical term in American and Canadian football

Other uses
 Death zone, high altitudes where the amount of oxygen is insufficient to sustain human life
 Dead zone (military), a blind spot in a fortification's field of fire which is relatively sheltered from defensive fire.